The Terminator: Future Shock is a first-person shooter video game based on The Terminator fictional universes developed and published by Bethesda Softworks in 1995. It was one of the first games in the first-person shooter genre to feature true, fully texture-mapped 3D environments and enemies, and pioneered the use of mouse-look control.

The game received mostly positive reviews, praising its advanced graphics for the time but criticizing the lack of a multiplayer mode.

A sequel, Skynet, was released in 1996.

Gameplay

Future Shock is played in the first-person perspective at all times. Each level in the game requires the player to solve a number of objectives before continuing to the next level, while fighting enemy robots with a wide variety of guns and grenades. Another obstacle in each level is the harsh terrain, as many areas contain too much radiation for the player character to remain alive. The terrain is navigated in three ways: on foot, in a jeep with a mounted cannon, or in an HK fighter (an aerial combat robot).

Future Shock has no multiplayer component. A multiplayer feature was finally available in the sequel, Skynet, which featured a deathmatch mode.

Plot
In The Terminator: Future Shock, the story begins in 2015 with the player's character escaping from an extermination camp with the help of the resistance. Once the player fully escapes during the first mission the character is introduced to John Connor, the leader of the resistance, and a young Kyle Reese. After completing several missions for the resistance, the resistance HQ is infiltrated and attacked by T800 model Terminators. After assisting Connor and the rest of the leadership in relocating to a new HQ, the player begins to experience phenomena in the form of enemies 'spawning' seemingly randomly on screen. It soon transpires that Skynet has perfected time displacement and as a result of the success of the player's endeavors, its future self is actively manipulating time by placing its forces in key strategic locations in an attempt to thwart successful resistance maneuvers. The resistance learn that Skynet is using time displacement to transmit information to itself in 1995 in an attempt to increase the speed at which it will become sentient. The player is ultimately sent on a mission to stop this process but must battle time as the resistance HQ is besieged and Kyle Reese and Connor himself are seriously wounded.

Contrary to the timeline specified in Terminator 2: Judgment Day, Future Shock depicts 1995 as the beginning of the nuclear war, not 1997. Throughout the game the player is surrounded by a post-apocalyptic environment. All around is death and decay, scattered with pockets of deadly fallout and the remnants of a shattered society.

Reception 

Tal Blevins of GameSpot wrote, "The game world itself is well thought-out; you can enter nearly every building to search for weapons, ammo, and med canisters as the familiar adrenaline-pumping Terminator soundtrack echoes in the background. [...] The graphics, music, and sound effects are superb. [...] Looks aside, the real beauty of Terminator: Future Shock is its smooth control system." Phil Bedard of Computer Games Magazine compared the game to Doom, "but with some things thrown in that make it different." Bedard praised the music and stereo sound effects, but wished the game had been done in high resolution. He criticized the difficult character controls, occasionally slow gameplay caused by a large number of objects in the game, and the lack of network play.

A reviewer for Next Generation said the game "is impressive in its ability to immerse the player into the post-apocalypse world of 'Terminator'" and sets itself apart from other first-person shooters with its freedom of exploration and destruction, but is ultimately "more frustrating than fun." He explained that the freedom of movement necessitates complex controls which are difficult to adjust to and require the player to routinely move their hand back-and-forth from the movement keys. He also found that the dark color palette makes it hard to see enemies. A reviewer for Maximum called it "a slick, professional blaster that sets new standards in the movie to game license wars". He cited the "tangible and involving" environments, the varied mission objectives, the player controlled vehicles, the storyline, the mouse look control, and the variety of weapons, and said that the game's only weakness is the lack of multiplayer.

T. Liam McDonald of PC Gamer called it a "damned fine game in many ways," praising the graphics and sound effects, but he was critical of the awkward controls and the difficulty in aiming, as well as the lack of multiplayer. Simon Cox, writing for the UK-based PC Gamer, praised Future Shock as a scary game and "one of the most atmospheric and believable shoot-'em-ups ever". However, he also considered the controls difficult to use at first. Roy Bassave of Knight Ridder said the game is the most sophisticated 3D game yet.

References

External links

1995 video games
Bethesda Softworks games
DOS games
DOS-only games
First-person shooters
Future Shock
Video games developed in the United States
Video games set in 2015
XnGine games
Single-player video games
Sprite-based first-person shooters